5-hydroxytryptamine receptor 3E is a protein that in humans is encoded by the HTR3E gene. The protein encoded by this gene is a subunit of the 5-HT3 receptor.

References

Further reading

External links
 

Serotonin receptors
Ion channels